Jolivet may refer to:

 Jolivet, Meurthe-et-Moselle, a commune in Meurthe-et-Moselle, France
 André Jolivet (1905-1974), French composer
 Pierre Jolivet (born 1952), French film director, actor, scriptwriter